This is a list of amphibious assault operations that have taken place during history. It is structured chronologically by war, then by theatre during wars such as World War II that covered large areas of the world simultaneously, and chronologically within those theatres. It also covers operations that were planned but cancelled for various reasons.
 Trojan War
 Siege of Troy – around 1200 B.C.
First Persian invasion of Greece
Battle of Marathon – 490 BCE
 Seventh Crusade
Siege of Damietta – 5 June 1249
Mongol invasions of Japan – 1274, 1281
Battle of Bun'ei
Battle of Kōan
War of the Portuguese Succession – 1580–1583
Spanish amphibious assault on Terceira Island (1583, aftermath of the Battle of Ponta Delgada)
Anglo-Spanish War (1585–1604)
Siege of Coruña
Battle of Lisbon
Japanese invasions of Korea - 1592–1598
 Queen Anne's War
Franco-Spanish War (1635–1659)
Battle of Bahía de Santoña
War of the Spanish Succession
 Siege of Port Royal - 1710
War of the Quadruple Alliance
Capture of Vigo - 1719
War of Jenkins' Ear
 Battle of Cartagena de Indias - March 1740
 King George's War
 Siege of Louisbourg - 1745
 French and Indian War
 Siege of Louisbourg - 1758
 Battle of Beauport
 Battle of the Plains of Abraham - 1759
 American Revolutionary War
 Battle of Nassau
 San Juan Expedition (1780)
 French Revolutionary War
 Siege of San Fiorenzo
 Invasion of France (1795)
 Anglo-Spanish War (1796–1808)
 Assault on Cádiz
 Battle of Santa Cruz de Tenerife (1797)
 Ferrol Expedition
 Napoleonic Wars
 Anglo-Russian invasion of Holland (1799)
 Battle of Abukir (1801)
 Walcheren Campaign (1809)
 Invasion of Guadeloupe (1810)
 Siege of Tarragona (1813)
 Krangeroen (1814)
 Quasi-War
Battle of Puerto Plata Harbor - 1800
 War of 1812
 Battle of York
 Battle of Fort George
 Second Battle of Sacket's Harbor
 Battle of Fort Oswego
 Battle of Mackinac Island
 Battle of New Orleans
 Venezuelan War of Independence
Expedition of Los Cayos (1816)
Margarita Campaign (1817)
 Invasion of Algiers in 1830
 Amphibious landing of Sidi-Ferruch – 14 June 1830 General de Bourmont
 Mexican–American War
 Siege of Veracruz – 9 March 1847 Winfield Scott lands army in Central Mexico
 Crimean War
 Assault of Bomarsund – 8 August 1854 Brigadier-général Harry Jone, Colonel Jacques Fieron Anglo-French operation against Russia in Finland
 Second Opium War
 Battle of the Pearl River Forts – 16 November 1856, American punitive operation against China
 Cochinchina Campaign
 Siege of Tourane (Da Nang) – 1–2 June 1858 Admiral Charles Rigault de Genouilly. Franco-Spanish operation.
 American Civil War
 Battle of Hatteras Inlet Batteries
 Battle of Roanoke Island
 Battle of New Bern
 Battle of Island Number Ten
 Battle of Fort Hindman
 Second Battle of Fort Fisher – 13–15 January 1865, American sailors make an amphibious assault while infantry attacks from land
Paraguayan War
Siege of Humaitá – culminating 8 August 1868, in which the Allies captured the Fortress of Humaitá.
 Korean Expedition
 Battle of Ganghwa – 10 June 1871, American attack on Korean forts at Ganghwa Island
 War of the Pacific
 Battle of Pisagua – 2 November 1879, Chilean troops defeat a joint Peruvian-Bolivian army and separates Iquique from Peru
Spanish–American War - 1898
Battle of Guantanamo Bay
Siege of Santiago
Battle of Manila (mock)
 Banana Wars
 Santo Domingo Affair – 11 February 1903, American forces land at Santo Domingo and rout Dominican rebels from the city.
 Battle of Veracruz – 21 April 1914, American forces land and occupy Veracruz, Mexico
 World War I
Battle of Bita Paka – 11 September 1914
 Siege of Tsingtao – November 1914
 Battle of Tanga – November 1914
 Gallipoli Campaign – 1915–1916
 Landing at Anzac Cove – 25 April 1915
 Landing at Cape Helles – 25 April 1915
 Landing at Suvla Bay – 6 August 1915
 Trebizond Campaign - February 1917
 Operation Albion – September 1917
 Zeebrugge Raid – 23 April 1918
 Estonian War of Independence
 Battle of Utria - 17 January 1919
 Rif War (1920)
 Amphibious assault of Alhucemas – 8 September 1925 General José Sanjurjo
 World War II
 Aleutian Islands Campaign
 Operation Landcrab – 11 May 1943
 Operation Cottage – 15 August 1943
 European Theatre
 Operation Chariot – 28 March 1942
 Soviet landing on Kerch peninsula
 Soviet landing on Rybachy peninsula
 Soviet landing Finnish coast
 Operation Jubilee – 18 August 1942
 Operation Sledgehammer – contingency plan for German collapse in the west
 Operation Gymnast – codename used for proposed invasion of Europe during 1942
 Operation Neptune – 6 June 1944
 Operation Overlord –  6 June 1944
 Operation Switchback – 9 October 1944
 Operation Vitality – 24 October 1944
 Operation Infatuate – 1 November 1944
 Mediterranean Theatre
 Operation Abstention – 25 February 1941
 Operation Ironclad – 5 May 1942
 Operation Agreement – 14 September 1942
 Operation Torch – 8 November 1942 – North Africa
 Operation Husky – 10 July 1943
 Operation Baytown – 3 September 1943
 Operation Slapstick – 9 September 1943
 Operation Avalanche – 9 September 1943
 Operation Shingle – 22 January 1944
 Operation Dragoon – 15 August 1944 – Southern France
 South East Asia Theatre
 Operation Dracula – 2 May 1945
 Operation Zipper
 South West Pacific Area
Battle of Goodenough Island – 22 October 1942
 Operation Cartwheel – 1943–1944 – Commanded by General MacArthur, it involved forces from both the South West Pacific Area (command) (SWPA) and the Pacific Ocean Areas (command).
 Operation Chronicle – 30 June 1943
 Operation Toenails – 30 June 1943
 Operation Director – 15 December 1943 – Arawe
 Operation Dexterity – 2 January 1944
 Operation Brewer – 29 February 1944 – Admiralty Islands campaign
 Operation Persecution – 22 April 1944 – Aitape
 Operation Hurricane – 23 May 1944 – Biak
 Operation Typhoon – 30 July 1944 – Sansapor
 Operation King II – 20 October 1944
 Operation Musketeer II – 9 January 1945 – Philippines Campaign (1944–45)
 Operation Victor III – 28 February 1945
 Operation Victor IV – 10 March 1945
 Operation Victor V – 17 April 1945
 Borneo campaign (1945)
 Pacific Ocean Areas
 Operation Watchtower – 7 August 1942
 Operation Cleanslate – 21 February 1943
 Operation Cherry Blossom – 1 November 1943 – Bougainville
 Operation Galvanic – 20 November 1943 – Tarawa
 Operation Galvanic – 20 November 1943 – Makin Island
 Operation Flintlock – 31 January 1944
 Operation Flintlock – 31 January 1944 – Kwajalein
 Operation Catchpole – 17 February 1944 – Eniwetok
 Operation Forager – 15 June 1944
 Operation Detachment – 15 February 1945
 Operation Iceberg – 1 April 1945
 Soviet Pacific landings
 Operation Olympic – planned for 1 November 1945
 Operation Coronet – planned for 1 March 1946
 Chinese Civil War and its aftermath
 Landing Operation on Hainan Island – March–April 1950
 Korean War
 Operation Chromite – 15 September 1950
 Suez Crisis
 Operation Musketeer – 6 November 1956
 Vietnam War
 Operation Starlite – 21 August 1965
Nigerian Civil War
Operation Tiger Claw
 The Troubles
 Operation Motorman – 31 July 1972
 Operation Peace of Cyprus Turkish invasion of Cyprus  - 20 July 1974
24 May 1972
Qua Viet Assault 
 Falklands War
 Operation Rosario – 2 April 1982
 Operation Corporate
 San Carlos – 28 May 1982
 Bluff Cove – 8 June 1982
 Sri Lankan Civil War
 Operation Balavegaya
 Operation Sea Breeze
 Iran–Iraq War
 Al Faw peninsula landings 1986
 Gulf War 1991
 Ad-Dawrah
 Iraq War
 Al-Faw Peninsula – Royal Marines amphibious assault, supported by British Royal Navy and Royal Australian Navy
 Invasion of Anjouan – 25 March 2008
 Operation Sledge Hammer - Kenya Defense Forces Kismayu, 2012
 United Arab Emirates takeover of Socotra - Socotra, 2018

Lists of battles
 
Lists of naval battles